Andrés Neuman (born January 28, 1977) is a Spanish-Argentine writer, poet, translator, columnist and blogger.

The son of Argentine émigré musicians, he was born in Buenos Aires, Argentina, to a mother of French and Spanish descent and a father of Eastern European-Jewish descent. He spent his childhood in Buenos Aires, before going into exile with his family to Granada, Spain. The stories of his European ancestors and family migrations, his childhood recollections and the kidnapping of his paternal aunt during the military dictatorship, can be read on his novel Una vez Argentina. He has a degree in Spanish Philology from the University of Granada, where he also taught Latin American literature. He holds both Argentine and Spanish citizenships.

Through a vote called by the Hay Festival, Neuman was selected among the most outstanding young Latin American authors, being included on the first Bogotá39 list . He was also selected by Granta magazine in Spanish and English as one of the 22 Best of Young Spanish-Language Novelists.

His fourth novel, the award-winning Traveller of the Century, first to be published in English, was selected among the best books of the year by The Guardian , The Independent  and Financial Times . This novel was also shortlisted for the Independent Foreign Fiction Prize, achieving a Special Commendation from the jury; as well as shortlisted for the International Dublin Literary Award, being named one of "the two frontrunners who so sure-footedly outpaced the strong pack", according to an article written by the jury for The Guardian.

His next novel translated into English was Talking to Ourselves, described by The New York Times as "a contemporary family drama and unflinching story of grief" as well as "a literary adventure", was longlisted for the Best Translated Book Award , shortlisted for the Oxford-Weidenfeld Translation Prize , and selected as number 1 among the Top 20 books of the year by Typographical Era. His collection of stories The Things We Don't Do was longlisted for the Best Translated Book Award and won the Firecracker Award for fiction, given by the Community of Literary Magazines and Presses with the American Booksellers Association. He is also the author of a travel book about Latin America, How to Travel without Seeing: Dispatches from the New Latin America.

His latest novel, Fracture, "filled with insights into cross-cultural intimacies" according to The New Yorker and "a moving examination of love and human relationships in the face of calamity" according to the Washington Independent Review of Books, was longlisted for the Premio Gregor von Rezzori in Italy, shortlisted for the Premio Dulce Chacón and the Premio San Clemente in Spain, and selected by El Mundo as one of the 5 best novels of the year in the Spanish language as well as one of the books of the year through a poll among critics, journalists and booksellers by El País. It has been recently published in English by Farrar, Straus and Giroux in the US and Granta in the UK.

In one of the essays of his book Entre paréntesis (Between Parentheses), the Chilean writer Roberto Bolaño stated about Neuman: "He has a gift. No good reader will fail to perceive in these pages something that can only be found in great literature, that which is written by true poets. The literature of the twenty-first century will belong to Neuman and to a handful of his blood brothers".

Awards and honours
1998 Antonio Carvajal Young Poetry Prize for his first collection of poems, Métodos de la noche. 
1999 Federico García Lorca Poetry Prize for Alfileres de luz. 
1999 First Finalist in the Herralde Prize for his first novel, Bariloche, which was selected as one of the best ten novels of the year by El Cultural, the literary supplement of the national newspaper El Mundo.
2002 Hiperión Prize for his poetry collection, El tobogán (2002).
2003 First Finalist in the Herralde Prize for his third novel, Una vez Argentina.
2009 Alfaguara Prize for his fourth novel, El viajero del siglo (Traveller of the Century, 2009). This book was selected as one of the five best novels of the year published in Spanish language, in two different votes: one called by the national newspaper El País among 50 critics and journalists  and another one called by the national newspaper El Mundo .
 2009 National Critics Prize: Premio de la Crítica Española for El viajero del siglo (Traveler of the Century).
2013 Independent Foreign Fiction Prize shortlist for Traveller of the Century (Nick Caistor & Lorenza Garcia; Spanish; Pushkin Press).
2013 Special Commendation from the Jury of the Independent Foreign Fiction Prize for Traveller of the Century.
2013 Best Translated Book Award longlist for Traveler of the Century.
2014 International Dublin Literary Award shortlist for Traveller of the Century (Nick Caistor & Lorenza Garcia; Spanish; Pushkin Press and Farrar, Straus and Giroux).
2014 Puterbaugh Fellow .
2015 Best Translated Book Award longlist for his fifth novel, Talking to Ourselves.
2015 Oxford-Weidenfeld Translation Prize shortlist for Talking to Ourselves.
2016 International Dublin Literary Award longlist for Talking to Ourselves (Nick Caistor & Lorenza Garcia; Spanish; Pushkin Press and Farrar, Straus and Giroux).
2016 Best Translated Book Award longlist for The Things We Don't Do.
2016 Firecracker Award for The Things We Don't Do.
2018 Premio Dulce Chacón shortlist for his sixth novel, Fractura. This book was also selected as one of the Books of the Year by El País, through a vote by critics, journalists and booksellers.
2019 Premio San Clemente Rosalía-Abanca shortlist for Fractura.
2020 Premio Gregor von Rezzori longlist for Fractura.

List of works
Novels
 Bariloche (1999). Barcelona: Anagrama. . Paperback edition, 2008, . First Finalist in the Herralde Prize.
 La vida en las ventanas (2002). Madrid: Espasa-Calpe. . First Finalist in the Primavera Prize.
 Una vez Argentina (2003). Barcelona: Anagrama. . First Finalist in the Herralde Prize. New rewritten and expanded edition: Una vez Argentina (2014). Madrid: Alfaguara. .
 El viajero del siglo (2009) (Traveller of the Century). Madrid: Alfaguara. . Winner of Alfaguara Prize and National Critics Prize.
 Hablar solos (2012) (Talking to Ourselves). Madrid: Alfaguara. .
 Fractura (2018). Madrid: Alfaguara. .
 Umbilical (2022). Madrid: Alfaguara.

Poetry
 Métodos de la noche (1998). Madrid: Ediciones Hiperión. . Antonio Carvajal Young Poetry Prize.
 El jugador de billar (2000). Valencia: Editorial Pre-Textos. .
 El tobogán (2002). Madrid: Ediciones Hiperión. . Hiperión Poetry Prize.
 Mística abajo (2008). Barcelona: Editorial Acantilado. .
 Década. Poesía 1997-2007 (2008). Barcelona: Editorial Acantilado. .
 No sé por qué y Patio de locos (2013). Valencia: Editorial Pre-Textos. 978-84-15576-47-1.
 Vivir de oído (2018). Madrid: La Bella Varsovia. .

Short stories
 El que espera (2000). Barcelona: Anagrama. .
 El último minuto (2001). Madrid: Espasa. . New edition by Páginas de Espuma (Madrid, 2007).
 Alumbramiento (2006). Madrid: Páginas de Espuma. .
 Hacerse el muerto (2011). Madrid: Páginas de Espuma. .

Others
 Die Winterreise of Wilhelm Müller (2003) (Viaje de invierno, Winter Journey translation from German to Spanish). Barcelona: Editorial Acantilado. .
 El equilibrista (2005). Barcelona: Editorial Acantilado. .
 Cómo viajar sin ver. Latinoamérica en tránsito (2010) (How to Travel Without Seeing. Latin America in Transit, travel book). Madrid: Alfaguara. .
 Caso de duda (2016). Granada: Cuadernos del Vigía. .
 Anatomía sensible (2019). Madrid: Páginas de Espuma.

English translations
 Traveller of the Century (2012, UK, Pushkin Press). 978-1906548667 . Translated by Nick Caistor and Lorenza García.
 Traveler of the Century (2012, US, Farrar, Straus and Giroux). 978-0374119393 . Translated by Nick Caistor and Lorenza García.
 Talking to Ourselves (2014, UK, Pushkin Press). 978-1782270553 . Translated by Nick Caistor and Lorenza García. 
 Talking to Ourselves (2014, US, Farrar, Straus and Giroux). 978-0374167530 . Translated by Nick Caistor and Lorenza García.
 The Things We Don't Do (2014, UK, Pushkin Press). 978-1782270737 . Translated by Nick Caistor and Lorenza García.
 The Things We Don't Do (2015, US, Open Letter Books). 978-1-940953-18-2 . Translated by Nick Caistor and Lorenza García.
 How to Travel without Seeing: Dispatches from the New Latin America (2016, US, Restless Books). 978-1632060556 . Translated by Jeffrey Lawrence.
 Fracture (2020, US, Farrar, Straus and Giroux). 978-0374158231 . Translated by Nick Caistor and Lorenza García.
 Fracture (2020, UK, Granta). 978-1783785131 . Translated by Nick Caistor and Lorenza García.
 Bariloche (2023, US, Open Letter). 978-1-948830-62-1 . Translated by Robin Myers.

References

External links

 Official website (some English texts)
 Review of Traveller of the Century in The Independent 
 Review of Traveller of the Century in The Guardian 
 Review of Traveler of the Century in The L Magazine 
 Short story in Words Without Borders 
 Interview in Untitled Books 
 Interview in Latineos. Latin America, Caribbean, arts & culture 
 PRISA News about the Alfaguara Prize 
 "Conquering Displacement With Words" by Valerie Miles in The New York Times 
 Audio Interview with Michael Cathcart ABC Radio
 Review of Talking to Ourselves in The Guardian 
 Review of Talking to Ourselves in The Independent 
 Review of Talking to Ourselves in Upcoming4.me 
Andres Neuman recorded at the Library of Congress for the Hispanic Division’s audio literary archive on Mar. 15, 2013

1977 births
Living people
Argentine emigrants to Spain
Argentine male novelists
Argentine people of Spanish descent
Argentine people of Italian descent
Argentine people of Jewish descent
Argentine writers in German
Spanish writers in German
Jewish Argentine writers
Writers from Buenos Aires